"Broken Bones" is the debut song of Canadian Eurodance group Love Inc., featuring vocals by Simone Denny. It was released in November 1997 as the first single from the album Love Inc. and as a cut on the Club Cutz 3 compilation released by RCA Records in the United States.

"Broken Bones" was one of the most played songs on Canadian radio in 1998, reaching the top spot on the RPM Dance chart, No. 6 on the Canadian Singles Chart, and No. 23 on the RPM 100 Hit Tracks chart. The song's video helped the act win a Best Video and Best Dance Video award at the 1998 MuchMusic Video Awards. and the song itself would give the act a Juno Award for Best Dance Recording in 1999. Outside Canada, the song reached No. 52 on Australia's ARIA Singles Chart in July 1999 and No. 8 on the UK Singles Chart in May 2003.

Track listings
CD maxi – Canada (1997)
 "Broken Bones" (City of Love – Radio Mix) – 4:02 	
 "Broken Bones" (City of Love – Club Mix) – 6:34 	
 "Broken Bones" (RipRock N' Booty's Magical Mystery Detour Mix - 12-inch Riprock 'n' Alex G remix) – 8:41 	
 "Broken Bones" (I Used to Sell You Things You Could Only Find on a Dancefloor – Remix) – 5:35 	
 "Broken Bones" (Groove Station – Radio Mix)

12-inch promo – United States (1998)	
 "Broken Bones" (City of Love – Radio Mix by Peter Ries) – 4:02 	
 "Broken Bones" (City of Love – Club Mix by Peter Ries) – 6:34 	
 "Broken Bones" (RipRock N' Booty's Magical Mystery Detour Mix – 12-inch Riprock 'n' Alex G remix) – 8:41 	
 "Broken Bones" (I Used to Sell You Things You Could Only Find on a Dancefloor – Remix by Florian Richter) – 5:35

Charts

Weekly charts

Year-end charts

References

1998 songs
1998 debut singles
Love Inc. (group) songs
Juno Award for Dance Recording of the Year recordings
ViK. Recordings singles